Alvernia may refer to:
Auvergne, France, in Italian
Alvernia University, a private university in Reading, Pennsylvania, US
Alvernia Matriculation Higher Secondary School, a school in India
Mount Alvernia, highest point in the Bahamas
Mount Alvernia Hospital, a private hospital in Singapore
Camp Alvernia, a day camp in Centerport, New York